City of Adelaide was an iron-hulled ship that was launched in Scotland in 1863, spent a long career in Australian passenger and cargo service, and sank off the coast of Queensland in 1916. She served with several Australian shipowners, including the Australasian Steam Navigation Company, Australasian United Steam Navigation Company and Howard Smith Company.

City of Adelaide ship was built as a three-masted sail-steamer. In 1871 one of her masts was removed to increase her passenger accommodation. In 1890 her steam engine was removed and she was refitted as a four-masted jackass barque. In 1902 she was turned into a coal hulk. In 1912 she was gutted by fire.

In 1916 her burnt hulk ran aground in Cockle Bay, Magnetic Island, Queensland. In 1942 four people were killed when a Royal Australian Air Force aircraft collided with one of her masts. In 1971 Cyclone Althea broke up part of her wreck, but its remains are still visible in Cockle Bay.

Building
J & G Thomson in Govan, Glasgow built City of Adelaide for the Australasian Steam Navigation Company. She was launched on 22 December 1863 and completed in 1864. Thomson's also built her marine steam engine, which had two cylinders and was rated at 200 horsepower.

Her owners registered City of Adelaide at Sydney. Her United Kingdom official number was 49261 and her code letters were WCHB.

Career
City of Adelaide ran regular passenger services between several destinations including Melbourne, Sydney, Honolulu and San Francisco.

In 1871 the ship was refitted, and her masts were reduced from three to two to increase her passenger accommodation. She served for a further 14 years before being retired in 1885. After the merger of the Australasian Steam Navigation Company with the Queensland Steam Shipping Company, in 1887, City of Adelaide continued in service with the successor company Australasian United Steam Navigation Company.

In 1890 to WA Ritchie of Sydney bought her and had her converted to a four-masted jackass barque by removing her boilers and engines and adding two new masts. In 1895 GJ Robertson of Sydney bought her. In 1902 Howard Smith Company of Townsville bought her and turned her into a coal hulk.

In 1912 the ship caught fire and burnt for some days before flames were extinguished. TIn 1915, by George Butler, the son of the first European resident of Magnetic Island, bought her burnt hulk. He had the hull stripped, and an attempt was made to float the ship to Magnetic Island’s Picnic Bay, where she would be scuttled as a breakwater for a jetty. However, as the ship was being towed from Townsville to Picnic Bay she ran aground off Magnetic Island's Cockle Bay.

Wreck

In World War II the Royal Australian Air Force (RAAF) used the wreck for target practice for bomber crews from the nearby Garbutt Airfield. On 22 October 1942, six RAAF Bristol Beaufort bombers of 100 Squadron made a coordinated mock torpedo attack on Townsville Harbour, followed by a coordinated practice bombing of the wreck.

The plane's fuselage disintegrated on impact, instantly killing three RAAF officers and a United States Navy officer aboard the bomber.

On 24 December 1971 Cyclone Althea struck the coast of northern Queensland near Magnetic Island, causing the part of the wreck’s iron hull to collapse. However, the wreck remains an artificial island, hosting a diversity of plant and animal life.

References

1863 ships
Ships built on the River Clyde
Ship fires
Maritime incidents in 1912
Maritime incidents in 1915
Coal hulks
1912 in Australia
1915 in Australia
1971 in Australia
1871–1900 ships of Australia
1901 – World War I ships of Australia
Merchant ships of Australia
Passenger ships of Australia
Iron and steel steamships of Australia
Barques of Australia
Shipwrecks of Magnetic Island